Organized retail crime (ORC) refers to professional shoplifting, cargo theft, retail crime rings and other organized crime occurring in retail environments. One person acting alone is not considered an example of organized retail crime.  These criminals move from store to store and even city to city.  Working in teams, some create distractions while others steal everything from infant formula to DVDs.  Often, they are stocking up on specified items at the request of the organized crime leader.

According to Brian J. Nadeau, former program manager of the FBI's Organized Retail Theft Program, “These aren’t shoplifters taking a pack of gum. These are professional thieves.”

The FBI has estimated that the losses attributed to organized retail crime could reach as much as $30 billion a year.”  In the UK, respondents to the British Retail Consortium's annual crime survey for the financial year 2013-2014 estimated that organized retail crime accounted for 40% of all shop thefts.

Notable cases

In early 2008 in Florida, a single shoplifting investigation turned up a massive organized enterprise.  Operating for at least five years, criminals had stolen up to $100 million in medicine, health and beauty goods.

Texas FBI agents pulled over a rental truck, leading them to $2.7 million in stolen assets.  The goods included $1 million in stolen baby formula that was stored in rodent-infested garages with no temperature control.

In January 2013, in Pennsylvania, West York Police (York County) announced the arrest of over 130 people and the organizer of a major organized retail crime ring in which the individuals targeted over 90 stores at over 300 locations in 5 counties in Pennsylvania and 2 counties in northern Maryland, with an estimated loss to retailers at $1 million.

Current US legislation

On July 15, 2008, Reps. Brad Ellsworth, D-Ind., and  Jim Jordan, R-Ohio, introduced the Organized Retail Crime Act of 2008 that would make it a felony to engage in activities that further organized retail crime.  Specific and narrow obligations upon on-line marketplaces known to be used by high-volume sellers of stolen merchandise are also included to benefit legitimate online businesses.  According to Rep. Ellsworth, "The bill will provide law enforcement officers and retailers with the tools they need to reveal the cloak of anonymity and bring these criminals to justice; while at the same time, preserving the online marketplace for law-abiding citizens."

On August 1, 2008, Sen. Dick Durbin, D-Ill. introduced the Combating Organized Retail Crime Act of 2008 that would give law enforcement the ability to prosecute among other things.

References

External links
Major Middle Eastern Crime Ring Dismantled, FBI

Theft
Organized crime
Organized crime activity
Retailing-related crime